An electromagnetic four-potential is a relativistic vector function from which the electromagnetic field can be derived. It combines both an electric scalar potential and a magnetic vector potential into a single four-vector.

As measured in a given frame of reference, and for a given gauge, the first component of the electromagnetic four-potential is conventionally taken to be the electric scalar potential, and the other three components make up the magnetic vector potential. While both the scalar and vector potential depend upon the frame, the electromagnetic four-potential is Lorentz covariant.

Like other potentials, many different electromagnetic four-potentials correspond to the same electromagnetic field, depending upon the choice of gauge.

This article uses tensor index notation and the Minkowski metric sign convention .  See also covariance and contravariance of vectors and raising and lowering indices for more details on notation. Formulae are given in SI units and Gaussian-cgs units.

Definition 

The electromagnetic four-potential can be defined as:

{| class="wikitable"
|-
! SI units 
! Gaussian units
|-
|  || 
|}

in which ϕ is the electric potential, and A is the magnetic potential (a vector potential). The units of Aα are V·s·m−1 in SI, and Mx·cm−1 in Gaussian-cgs.

The electric and magnetic fields associated with these four-potentials are:

{| class="wikitable"
|-
! SI units 
! Gaussian units
|-
|  || 
|-
|  || 
|}

In special relativity, the electric and magnetic fields transform under Lorentz transformations. This can be written in the form of a tensor - the electromagnetic tensor. This is written in terms of the electromagnetic four-potential and the four-gradient as:

assuming that the signature of the Minkowski metric is (+ − − −). If the said signature is instead (− + + +) then:

This essentially defines the four-potential in terms of physically observable quantities, as well as reducing to the above definition.

In the Lorenz gauge 
 

Often, the Lorenz gauge condition  in an inertial frame of reference is employed to simplify Maxwell's equations as:

{| class="wikitable"
|-
! SI units 
! Gaussian units
|-
|  || 
|}

where Jα are the components of the four-current, and

is the d'Alembertian operator. In terms of the scalar and vector potentials, this last equation becomes:

{| class="wikitable"
|-
! SI units 
! Gaussian units
|-
|  || 
|-
|  || 
|}

where 
 

is the retarded time.  This is sometimes also expressed with 
 

where the square brackets are meant to indicate that the time should be evaluated at the retarded time.  Of course, since the above equations are simply the solution to an inhomogeneous differential equation, any solution to the homogeneous equation can be added to these to satisfy the boundary conditions. These homogeneous solutions in general represent waves propagating from sources outside the boundary.

When the integrals above are evaluated for typical cases, e.g. of an oscillating current (or charge), they are found to give both a magnetic field component varying according to r (the induction field) and a component decreasing as r  (the radiation field).

Gauge freedom 

When flattened to a one-form,  can be decomposed via the Hodge decomposition theorem as the sum of an exact, a coexact, and a harmonic form,

.

.

.

See also 
 Four-vector
 Covariant formulation of classical electromagnetism
 Jefimenko's equations
 Gluon field
 Aharonov–Bohm effect

References 

 
 

Theory of relativity
Electromagnetism
Four-vectors